The McNamara fallacy (also known as the quantitative fallacy), named for Robert McNamara, the US Secretary of Defense from 1961 to 1968, involves making a decision based solely on quantitative observations (or metrics) and ignoring all others. The reason given is often that these other observations cannot be proven.

The quote originally referred to McNamara's ideology during the two months that he was president of Ford Motor Company, but has since been interpreted to refer to his attitudes during the Vietnam War.

Examples in warfare

The Vietnam War
The McNamara fallacy is often considered in the context of the Vietnam War, in which enemy body counts were taken to be a precise and objective measure of success.  War was reduced to a mathematical model: By increasing estimated enemy deaths and minimizing one's own, victory was assured.  Critics note that guerrilla warfare, widespread resistance, and inevitable inaccuracies in estimates of enemy casualties can thwart this formula.  McNamara's interest in quantitative figures is seen in Project 100,000: by lowering admission standards to the military, enlistment was increased.  Key to this decision was the idea that one soldier is, in the abstract, more or less equal to another, and that with the right training and superior equipment, he would factor positively in the mathematics of warfare.

US Air Force Brigadier General Edward Lansdale reportedly told McNamara, who was trying to develop a list of metrics to allow him to scientifically follow the progress of the war, that he was not considering the feelings of the common rural Vietnamese people. McNamara wrote it down on his list in pencil, then erased it and told Lansdale that he could not measure it, so it must not be important.

The global war on terror
Donald Rumsfeld, US Secretary of Defense under George W. Bush, sought to prosecute wars with better data, clear objectives, and achievable goals.  Writes Jon Krakauer,

In modern clinical trials
There has been increasing discussion of the McNamara fallacy in medical literature. In particular, the McNamara fallacy is invoked to describe the inadequacy of only using progression-free survival (PFS) as a primary endpoint in clinical trials for agents treating metastatic solid tumors simply because PFS is an endpoint which is merely measurable, while failing to capture outcomes which are more meaningful, such as overall quality of life or overall survival.

In competitive admissions processes
In competitive admissions processes—such as those used for graduate medical education—evaluating candidates using only numerical metrics results in ignoring non-quantifiable factors and attributes which may ultimately be more relevant to the applicant's success in the position.

See also

 Allegory of the cave
 Goodhart's law
 Newton's flaming laser sword
 Occam's razor
 Streetlight effect
 Surrogation
 Truth
 Verificationism
 Verisimilitude

References 

Inductive fallacies
Metaphors referring to people